The Arlington Branch Library and Fire Hall, in Riverside, California, is a historic library and a fire station which was listed on the National Register of Historic Places in 1993.

The Classical Revival library was built in 1908 and renovated in 1927–28.  It was originally designed by architect Seeley L. Pillar (1865-1968), and architect G. Stanley Wilson (1879-1958) designed the renovations.

References

External links

Fire stations on the National Register of Historic Places in California
Libraries on the National Register of Historic Places in California
National Register of Historic Places in Riverside County, California
Neoclassical architecture in California
1908 establishments in California
Government buildings completed in 1908